Joseph Troy Smith (born December 17, 1977) is a former American professional basketball player. He played as a point guard-shooting guard.

College career
Smith played college basketball at the University of Alabama–Huntsville, with the Alabama–Huntsville Chargers, from 1996 to 2001.

Professional career
Smith played basketball in various leagues over his pro career. Some of the pro leagues that played in during his career included: the Italian LBA League, the Russian SuperLeague A, the Israeli Super League, the European-wide 2nd tier EuroCup, the Argentine LNB League, and the Brazilian NBB League.

Awards and accomplishments
Italian 2nd Division Champion: (2007)
FIBA EuroChallenge All-Star Day MVP: (2008)
Argentine League Top Scorer: (2012)
2× Brazilian League All-Star: (2013, 2014)
FIBA Americas League Champion: (2013)

References

External links
EuroCup Profile
FIBA Europe Profile
FIBA Americas Profile
LatinBasket.com Profile
Italian League Profile 
Italian 2nd Division Profile 
Brazilian League Profile 

1977 births
Living people
Alabama–Huntsville Chargers men's basketball players
American expatriate basketball people in Argentina
American expatriate basketball people in Brazil
American expatriate basketball people in Israel
American expatriate basketball people in Italy
American expatriate basketball people in Latvia
American expatriate basketball people in Russia
American men's basketball players
Barak Netanya B.C. players
Basketball players from Louisiana
BC Spartak Saint Petersburg players
BK Ventspils players
Esporte Clube Pinheiros basketball players
La Unión basketball players
Montecatiniterme Basketball players
Novo Basquete Brasil players
Nuova AMG Sebastiani Basket Rieti players
Pallacanestro Biella players
Pallacanestro Reggiana players
Point guards
Rockford Lightning players
Shooting guards